Peter Richards is a Welsh-born Irish artist and curator. Early in his career he worked primarily on video art and installations, later also working in performance art. Richards is living and working in Belfast, Northern Ireland, since 1994.

Early life and education 
Born in Cardiff in 1970, Richards studied a BA in Fine Art at Howard Gardens, Cardiff, part of the University of Wales. He moved to Northern Ireland to further his studies, completing an MPhil. entitled "Representations of Representations" in 1998 at the University of Ulster. He has been director of the Golden Thread Gallery in Belfast since 2002.

Art career
Early in his career Richards was producing predominantly video art works. These works generally took the form of single-channel installations, featuring the artist perform to camera, such as his "Untitled: table & chair".
In the mid-1990s he began creating performance art works and photographic documentation of the performance art as a single entity.

The first of "performance lucida" series took place as part of House Style, a group event at The Bedroom Gallery (The Bedroom Gallery later went on to become BoBo's in London) in the east of Belfast. His first solo exhibition took place at the Context Gallery, Derry, as part of Beyond Borders Plus and was entitled Corrective Perspective. The work was in three parts, the first an installation featuring a pulley system and the gallery being divided into two, one brightly lit and the other in complete darkness. The second part featured a performance that saw the artist hung upside down from the pulley system and swing toward the dividing wall. The audience had been assembled in the darkened space to witness a live project, caused due to a pinhole in the wall, onto three large sheets of previously unexposed photographic paper.

The nature of the projection inverted the image of the artist, who appeared on the screen to be performing a series of gravity defying acts. When the performance was complete, the artist was lowered from the pulley system. He then came through to the darkened space and proceeded to process the now exposed photographic paper. He put forward that the audience had witnessed the documentation of the action/event rather the action/event itself. The third part of the work saw the photographic paper installed in the gallery with the residue from the event.
Richards developed a significant body of works exploring the representations of documentation of performance art as featured in publications. He also created a series of "collective histories" of performance art works. Stating that these works acted as a model for simple contradicts between knowledge and experience that are formative of our understanding.
More recently Richards has explored other aspects of our interpretation of representations, focusing in particular on the subject of 'memorials' in Northern Ireland. He has exhibited extensively nationally and internationally most notably participating in first presentation at the Venice Biennale in 2005.

Curator
When Richards began his professional career in Belfast in the mid-1990s he was working both as an artist and as a curator. He was based at Catalyst Arts, Northern Ireland's pioneering contemporary visual arts, artist-run organisation (est 1994) between 1996 and 1998. Since his time at Catalyst Arts Richards has worked as a guest curator at the Context Gallery in Derry and at the Old Museum Arts Centre in Belfast. His curatorial contribution to contemporary art in Northern Ireland is best known for his work at the Golden Thread Gallery, where he has worked since 2001, to profile established contemporary Northern Irish artists, such as: Lisa Byrne, Ian Charlesworth, Colin Darke, Willie Doherty, Susan MacWilliam, Mary McIntyre, Locky Morris, Philip Napier, Aisling O'Beirn, Paul Seawright, Dan Shipsides, Victor Sloan. He has also worked with their peers internationally, such as William Kentridge, Destiny Deacon, Marjectica Potrc, Azorro Group, Zbigniew Libera, Shane Cullen, Delcy Morelos, Gerald Byrne. Richards has worked closely with a number of younger artists creating a platform for them to develop their practice.

References

External links 
 Artfacts: Peter Richards Profile 
Peter Richards
Golden Thread Gallery
Catalyst Arts
Arts Council of Northern Ireland
Circa Magazine
Context Gallery
British Council
Sofaer, Joshua, Conflict of Interest: Performance as a Spectator 

1970 births
Alumni of Cardiff School of Art and Design
Art in Northern Ireland
Artists from Cardiff
Irish art
Irish performance artists
Irish contemporary artists
Video artists from Northern Ireland
Photographers from Northern Ireland
Multimedia artists from Northern Ireland
Irish curators
Living people
Alumni of Ulster University